Ephron Jardell Mason-Clark (born 25 August 1999) is an English footballer who plays for EFL League One club Peterborough United, as a winger and forward.

Club career
Mason-Clark made his debut for Barnet on 4 October 2016, as a 59th-minute substitute for Justin Amaluzor in an EFL Trophy match against Norwich City U23. Mason-Clark joined Metropolitan Police on loan later that month. He made his English Football League debut against Crewe Alexandra on 19 November 2016. In October 2018, Mason-Clark signed a new-long-term deal with the Bees, keeping him with the club until 2021. He scored his first goal for the Bees in the FA Trophy against Bath City on 15 December 2018. His first league goal came on 1 January 2019 against Boreham Wood, and he also won a penalty in the Bees' 1–0 FA Cup third round win away at Sheffield United on 6 January, which was converted by Shaq Coulthirst. He then set up Coulthirst for Barnet's first equaliser against Brentford in their 3–3 draw in the fourth round.

On 26 August 2022, Mason-Clark signed for EFL League One club Peterborough United for an undisclosed fee on a three-year contract.

International career
Mason-Clark was called up to the England C team in June 2019. He made his debut when he started in an away friendly against Estonia U23 on 6 June.

Career statistics

References

External links

1999 births
Living people
Footballers from Lambeth
English footballers
England semi-pro international footballers
Association football midfielders
Barnet F.C. players
Metropolitan Police F.C. players
Peterborough United F.C. players
Isthmian League players
English Football League players
National League (English football) players
Black British sportspeople